

Surname 
Hyman is the surname of:
 Alan Hyman (1910–1999), author and screenwriter
 Alexander C. Hyman (Born 1993), American Businessman
 Albert Hyman (1893–1972), co-inventor of the artificial pacemaker
 Anthony Hyman (disambiguation), several people
 Ben Zion Hyman (1891–1984), Canadian-Jewish bookseller
 Bill Hyman (1875–1959), English cricketer
 C. S. Hyman (1854–1926), Canadian businessman, politician, and sportsman
 Dick Hyman (born 1927), American jazz pianist/keyboardist and composer 
 Dorothy Hyman (born 1941), British athlete
 Eric Hyman (born 1950), collegiate athletic director
 Flora ("Flo") Jean Hyman (1954–1986), American volleyball player and Olympic silver medalist
 Herbert Hyman (1918–1985), American sociologist
 Ishmael Hyman (born 1995), American football player
 James Hyman (born 1970), British DJ and music supervisor
 James (Mac) Hyman (born 1950), Applied mathematician
 Jeffrey Hyman (1951–2001), birth name of punk rock singer-songwriter Joey Ramone
 Jennifer Hyman, CEO and co-founder of Rent the Runway
 John Adams Hyman (1840–1891), born a slave, later became Congressman for North Carolina
 John Hyman (philosopher) (born 1960), British philosopher
 Kemar Hyman (born 1989), Caymanian sprinter
 Libbie Hyman (1888–1969), American zoologist
 Louis Hyman (born 1977), American writer and economic historian
 Marc Hyman, Hollywood film writer
 Mark Hyman (born 1959), American physician and author
 Mark E. Hyman (born 1958), Vice President for Corporate Relations for Sinclair Broadcast Group
 Martin Hyman (1933–2021), British long-distance runner
 Misty Hyman (born 1979), American swimmer and Olympic gold medalist
 Monique Holsey-Hyman, American politician, social worker, and academic
 Phyllis Hyman (1949–1995), American soul singer, model and actress
 Ray Hyman (born 1928), Professor Emeritus of Psychology at the University of Oregon, magician, and critic of parapsychology
 Rob Hyman (born 1950), American singer, songwriter, and producer
 Trina Schart Hyman (1939–2004), American illustrator of children's books
 William B. Hyman (1814–1884), Louisiana Supreme Court justice
 Zach Hyman (born 1992), Canadian Professional Hockey Player and Award Winning Author

Given name 
Hyman, or a variant Hymen is the given name of:
 Hyman Bass (born 1932), American mathematician
 Hyman "Hy" Buller (1926–1968), Canadian All Star NHL ice hockey player
  (1931–1995), violinist and composer
 Hyman "Hy" Cohen (born 1931), baseball player
 Frederic Hymen Cowen (1852–1935), British conductor, composer, and pianist
 Hyman George Rickover (1900–1986), US Navy Admiral
 Hyman "Hank" Greenberg (1911–1986), American Hall of Fame baseball player
 Hyman Holtz (c. 1896 – c. 1939), New York racketeer
 Hyman Kaplan, fictional character
 Hyman Kreitman (1914–2001), British businessman
 Hyman Krustofski, a fictional character on The Simpsons
 Hyman Martin (1903–1987), Chicago mobster
 Hyman Minsky (1919–1996), US economist who studied financial crises
 Hyman Roth, a fictional character in The Godfather series of books and films
 Hymen B. Mintz (1909–1986), US politician

See also
 Hyman Archive
 Chayyim, the basis for this name
 Hymie (disambiguation)
 Heyman
 Hymen
 Haiman
 Hijmans
 Heiman
 Heymann

Jewish surnames
John James Hyman chaplain to Robert E. Lee. Nickname JJ Hyman. He persuaded Robert E. Lee to surrender to the north. John James Hyman was with him at the time he surrendered to the north.